Takagaki (written: 高垣) is a Japanese surname. Notable people with the surname include:

, Japanese voice actress and singer
, Japanese writer
, Japanese model and actress
Shinzo Takagaki (1893–1977), Japanese judoka

Japanese-language surnames